General Pran Nath Thapar  (23 May 1906 – 23 June 1975) was the fourth Chief of Army Staff of the Indian Army. The Sino-Indian War was fought during his term, in which the Indian Army fared poorly. Thapar resigned during the last stages of the war, handing charge to Lt. Gen. J. N. Chaudhuri.

Personal life
General Pran Nath Thapar was born at Lahore into a prominent Punjabi Khatri family. He was the youngest son of Diwan Bahadur Kunj Behari Thapar of Lahore. The journalist Karan Thapar is his son. The historian Romila Thapar is his niece and the conservationist and tiger expert, Valmik Thapar is his great nephew. His elder brother was Daya Ram Thapar, an officer in the Indian Medical Service and later Director General Armed Forces Medical Services.

Thapar was distantly related to the Indian Prime Minister Jawaharlal Nehru through his wife. In March 1936, Thapar married Bimla Bashiram, the eldest daughter of Rai Bahadur Bashiram Sahgal and granddaughter of Rai Bahadur Ramsaran Das. Bimla Thapar was a sister of Gautam Sahgal, whose wife Nayantara Sahgal was a daughter of Vijayalakshmi Pandit and niece of Jawaharlal Nehru. General Thapar and Smt. Bimla Thapar had four children, of whom the youngest is the journalist Karan Thapar.

Career
After graduating from Government College, Lahore, he trained at the Royal Military College, Sandhurst, passing out on 4 February 1926 as a second lieutenant. He passed out in the same batch as K.S. Thimayya, who also went on to become Chief of the Army Staff. He spent the next year attached to a British Army battalion stationed in India. On 18 April 1927 he was formally appointed to the Indian Army, ranking as a second lieutenant.  He did his regimental duties with the 2nd battalion, 1st Punjab Regiment for ten years and later attended the staff courses at Quetta in India and Minley Manor in England.

He served in Burma during the second World War in 1941 and later in the Middle East and Italy. By October 1942 he was serving on the staff as a brigade major. He was appointed as assistant military secretary in 1945, and commanded the 1st Battalion of the 1st Punjab Regiment in Indonesia in 1946. Subsequently, he went on to serve as the commander of the 161 Indian Infantry Brigade in East Bengal. During the Partition of India, Thapar officiated as the Director of Military Operations and Intelligence.

In November 1947, he was promoted to the acting rank of major general. He served as the Chief of the General Staff for a few months and later as Military Secretary until August 1949. He was appointed Master General of the Ordnance on 8 August 1949.

On 1 January 1950, Thapar was promoted to substantive major-general, and was given command of an infantry division on 10 April. He commanded a division for four years until 1954 and was promoted to the local rank of lieutenant general in 1954 as Commander of a Corps. He was selected to attend the Imperial Defence College, London in 1955. After successful completion of the course, he was appointed General Officer Commanding-in-Chief, Southern Command on 21 January 1957, with the acting rank of lieutenant-general, and was promoted to the substantive rank on 1 February. He became General Officer Commanding-in-Chief of Western Command in 1959. Thapar took over as Chief of Army Staff of the Indian Army on 8 May 1961 and served until 19 November 1962, when he resigned from the army after the defeat by China in the Sino-Indian War of October and November. He was also colonel of the Rajputana Rifles.

Later life
After resigning from the army, he was appointed as Indian Ambassador to Afghanistan from August 1964 to January 1969. He died on his farm, White Gates, in Chhattarpur, New Delhi, on 23 June 1975 at the age of 69.

Awards and decorations

Dates of rank

Notes

References

Bibliography
 

1906 births
1975 deaths
British Indian Army officers
Indian Army personnel of World War II
Chiefs of Army Staff (India)
Punjabi people
Graduates of the Royal Military College, Sandhurst
Military personnel from Punjab, India
Ambassadors of India to Afghanistan
People of the Sino-Indian War
Indian generals
Graduates of the Staff College, Quetta
Graduates of the Royal College of Defence Studies
Recipients of the Param Vishisht Seva Medal